Katarzyna Maria Kulczak (born September 25, 1954 in Bydgoszcz) is a Polish sprint canoer who competed in the mid-1970s. She won a bronze medal in the K-2 500 m event at the 1975 ICF Canoe Sprint World Championships in Belgrade.

Kulczak also finished sixth in the K-2 500 m event at the 1976 Summer Olympics in Montreal, Quebec, Canada.

References

Sports-reference.com profile.

1954 births
Canoeists at the 1976 Summer Olympics
Living people
Olympic canoeists of Poland
Polish female canoeists
Sportspeople from Bydgoszcz
ICF Canoe Sprint World Championships medalists in kayak